Neri (lit. "my candle/lamp") is a unisex given name mainly used in Israel. Its derived from "Ner" which means candle in Hebrew. It is a variant form of "Neriya", meaning "Yah (יהו/יה) is my candle (נֵרִי)".

It may refer to:
 Neri di Bicci (1419–1491), Italian painter
 Neri Bandiera (born 1989), Argentine footballer
 Neri Cardozo (born 1986), Argentine footballer
 Neri Colmenares (born 1959), Filipino human rights lawyer and activist
 Neri Corsini (disambiguation)
 Neri Marcorè (born 1966), Italian actor, voice actor, imitator, TV presenter and singer
 Neri Naig, Filipina actress Nerizza Garcia Presnede Naig-Miranda (born 1985)
 Neri Oxman (born 1976), Israeli architect, designer, and professor at the Massachusetts Institute of Technology Media Lab
 Neri Parenti (born 1950), Italian director and screenwriter

See also 
 Nery McKeen (born 1957), Cuban retired middle distance runner

References 

Hebrew-language given names
Unisex given names